This is a list of adult fiction books that topped The New York Times Fiction Best Seller list in 1982.

See also

 1982 in literature
 New York Times Fiction Best Sellers of 1982
 Lists of The New York Times Fiction Best Sellers
 Publishers Weekly list of bestselling novels in the United States in the 1980s

References

1982
.
1982 in the United States